Sparganothoides carycrosana is a species of moth of the family Tortricidae. It is found in Mexico from Sinaloa and Tamaulipas to Veracruz, south through Guatemala to Costa Rica.

The length of the forewings is 8.3–10.3 mm. The ground colour of the forewings is brown to brownish orange. The hindwings have grey scaling. Adults are on wing from January to June in Costa Rica and from May to August in Guatemala and Mexico. There are probably multiple generations per year.

Etymology
The species name is derived from Greek karykrous (meaning nut brown).

References

Moths described in 2009
Sparganothoides